Chondrosiida is an order of sea sponges within the subclass Verongimorpha.

References

Verongimorpha
Sponge orders